Dai Commandery was a commandery (jùn) of the state of Zhao established BC and of northern imperial Chinese dynasties until the time of the Emperor Wen of the Sui dynasty (r. AD581–604). It occupied lands in what is now Hebei, Shanxi, and Inner Mongolia. Its seat was usually at Dai or Daixian (near present-day Yuzhou in Hebei), although it was moved to Gaoliu (present-day Yanggao in Shanxi) during the Eastern Han.

Name

The name derives from the White Di kingdom of Dai, conquered by the Zhao family of Jin.

History

Zhao Kingdom

Dai Commandery was first established around 300BC during China's Warring States Period by the state of Zhao's King Yong, posthumously known as the Wuling ("Martial-&-Numinous") King. The commandery seat—then known as Dai—was southwest of present-day Yuzhou in Hebei. It was the former capital of the independent state of Dai, which had been conquered by King Yong's ancestors around 476BC. He created Dai Commandery along with its companion commanderies of Yanmen and Yunzhong to consolidate his conquests from invasions of the Loufan (t s Lóufán) and "forest nomads" ( Línhú) in 306 and 304BC.

Following the Qin conquest of Zhao, Zhao Jia attempted to regroup at Dai, declaring himself its king. This Kingdom of Dai was ended by Qin in 222BC, just prior to the declaration of the Qin Empire two years later.

Qin Empire

Dai Commandery was one of the divisions of the Qin Empire. Its seat—then known as Daixian—continued to be near present-day Yuzhou.

Eighteen Kingdoms

During the interregnum following Qin's collapse, Dai was one of the Eighteen Kingdoms established by Xiang Yu. It was ruled by Zhao Xie and Chun Yu.

Western Han Empire

Under the Han, Dai Prefecture formed part of the province of Bingzhou and oversaw 18 counties, both within and beyond the Great Wall. Along with Yunzhong and Yanmen, it also formed part of the Principality of Dai, used as an imperial appanage. The Book of Han records Dai Commandery having 278,754 people living in 56,771 households. The Han administration kept the seat at Daixian near present-day Yuzhou and continued the Qin-era counties (renaming "New Pingshu County" to simply "Pingshu County"), with the addition of:

Xin Empire
Under the short-lived Xin dynasty established by Wang Mang, several of the Han counties were renamed.

Eastern Han Empire
Under the Eastern Han, Dai Commandery formed part of the province of Youzhou. Its seat—then known as Gaoliu—was southwest of present-day Yanggao in northeastern Shanxi.

Wei Kingdom
During China's Three Kingdoms Period, Wei returned the commandery seat to Daixian (near present-day Yuzhou, Hebei).

Sixteen Kingdoms

During China's Sixteen Kingdoms Period, both Later Yan and the Northern Wei had commanderies named Dai. Northern Wei's lay to the west, with its seat at Pingcheng (present-day Datong, Shanxi).

Separate from these, Tuoba Yilu was declared "Duke of Dai" by the Jin in AD310 and (vassal) "King of Dai" by the same court in 315. This Xianbei Kingdom of Dai lasted until 376, and its dynasts were responsible for the later state of Northern Wei. It held some lands in northern Shanxi and Hebei but was mostly to their north in what is now Inner Mongolia, with their capital at Shengle (northwest of present-day Horinger).

Sui Empire

Dai Commandery continued until its abolishment under the Wen Emperor of Sui, who replaced it in 585 with Dai Prefecture, whose seat was at Guangwu or Yanmen (present-day Daixian, Shanxi).

Notes

References

Citations

Bibliography

 . 
 .
 .
 .
 . 
 .
 . 
 .
 .

External links
 《代郡》 at Baike.com 

Former commanderies of China
Commanderies of the Qin dynasty
Commanderies of the Han dynasty
Commanderies of the Jin dynasty (266–420)
Commanderies of the Sui dynasty